Garmeh is a city in North Khorasan Province, Iran.

Garmeh may also refer to:

Garmeh, Fars, a village in Marvdasht County, Fars Province
Garmeh, Ilam, a village in Shirvan and Chardaval County, Ilam Province
Garmeh-ye Dul, a village in Saqqez County, Kurdistan Province
Garmeh, Isfahan, a village in Isfahan Province
Garmeh Khush, a village in Esfarayen County, North Khorasan Province
Garmeh, Fariman, a village in Fariman County, Razavi Khorasan Province
Garmeh, Mashhad, a village in Mashhad County, Razavi Khorasan Province
Garmeh County, in North Khorasan Province
Garmeh-ye Jonubi Rural District, in East Azerbaijan Province
Garmeh-ye Shomali Rural District, in East Azerbaijan Province